The men's time trial H4 road cycling event at the 2020 Summer Paralympics took place on 31 August 2021, at Fuji Speedway, Tokyo. 12 riders competed in the event.

The H4 classification is for paraplegics with impairment from T11 down, and amputees unable to kneel. These riders operate a hand-operated cycle.

Results
The event took place on 31 August 2021, at 9:25:

References

Men's road time trial H4